The International Fountain, designed by Tokyo-based architects Kazuyuki Matsushita and Hideki Shimizu during 1961–1962 for the Century 21 Exposition (also known as the Seattle World's Fair), is a concrete fountain and sculpture installed in Seattle Center in the U.S. state of Washington.

Design
The International Fountain was built on the site of the former Mercer Playground in Seattle's Queen Anne neighborhood. Mercer Playground had stood at that location since the 1910s. During the planning for Century 21, Mercer Playground was identified as the central site of "The Boulevards of the World", which was to be the centerpiece of the fair. The initial design concept called for a narrow lagoon with gondolas and crossed by a bridge, but a design competition was held for a "light, water and sculpture display" in the summer of 1960. Matsushita and Shimizu submitted the winning design, a fountain designed to reflect "mankind's efforts to explore the farthest reaches of outer space." The 1960 design eschewed sculptural decorations in favor of water jets and the parabolic shapes they produced.

The competition received 261 entries, of which 72 were international and 189 came from the United States. In the first stage of the competition, the jury narrowed the entries down to five finalists, each of which received a  prize. The jury, which consisted of noted architects and sculptors Nathaniel A. Owings, Bernard Rosenthal, Garrett Eckbo, Peter Oberlander, Paul Thiry, and Fred McCoy, selected Matsushita and Shimizu unanimously from the five finalists. One juror commented "I feel that the scheme is not just good ... it's a big scheme, it's a terrific scheme ... and I think that the fact that he didn't have a model, when the other four did, and that he still got the winning vote is indicative of the fact that it is so outstanding ... I feel that this human experience has to happen; can happen in many ways." At the time of selection, Matsushita was 29 and Shimizu was 26, and both were employed as associate architects with Taisei Construction Company in Tokyo. For their winning design, Matsushita and Shimizu were awarded .

1995 rebuild

The fountain was rebuilt in 1995 by WET Design as part of $6.5 million project including landscape design by Kenichi Nakano. Prior to 1995, the central dome had protruding nozzles and was surrounded by irregular white rocks to recreate a "lunar landscape", discouraging people from interacting with the water features. After the 1995 rebuild, the rocks were removed and the dome was reconfigured with myriad jets nearly flush with the dome's surface, allowing visitors to approach and play with the fountain.

Two moats of water feed the jets: one moat for the "micro shooters" and another moat for the "fleur-de-lis" and "super shooters". The fountain recirculates the water and filters it through sand. During certain times of the day, the water display is synchronized to music for up to twelve minutes. The fountain jet designs are patented by WET.

2021 refresh 
Beginning April 6th 2021, the fountain was closed until June 30th 2021 for a refresh to the area. Updates include: 

 Re-Caulking of the bowl
 Replacing the floodlights between the micro shooters with colored LED lights
 Updates to micro shooters

Statistics

The fountain is lit with floodlamps set in the floor.

The water jets are arranged as follows:
56 "Micro shooters" arrayed as a ring buried in the granite blocks of the fountain floor, on the outer perimeter surrounding the dome. These shoot straight up.
77 "Fleur-de-lis" - plate-sized nozzles on the dome, shooting medium-high arcs.
137 "Mist nozzles", each with an opening the size of a pinhead to generate fog

There is an additional ring of floodlights between the "micro shooters" and the dome.

See also
 1962 in art

References

External links

 
 
 
 

1960s in Seattle
1962 establishments in Washington (state)
1962 sculptures
Concrete sculptures in Washington (state)
Fountains in Washington (state)
Outdoor sculptures in Seattle
Seattle Center
World's fair sculptures